The CPW (Compact Personal Weapon) is a multi-caliber submachine gun developed by ST Kinetics of Singapore as a PDW-class firearm. The prototype is chambered in 9×19mm Parabellum but the manufacturer assures that the weapon's modular design allows for a simple caliber conversion to either 5.7×28mm or 4.6×30mm.

Design details
The CPW is a modular selective fire lever-delayed blowback operated weapon (using what STK calls a cam recoil mitigation mechanism), which contributes to the low felt recoil and allows for use with high pressure ammunition. The weapon has a conventional submachine gun layout with the magazine housed in the pistol grip. The pistol grip's backstrap and the 30-round magazine are molded from a translucent plastic which allows the shooter to quickly verify the remaining level of ammunition visually. The receiver is machined from a lightweight aluminum alloy and most of the other components are made of a high-strength polymer to further reduce weight and costs.

The barrel and bolt assembly can be quickly replaced, converting the submachine gun to the small-caliber armor-piercing PDW ammunition.

The CPW is fully ambidextrous.  Every lever, control or toggle has been mirrored on the opposite side of the receiver – this includes the cocking handle, the fire control selector/manual safety switch (installed above the pistol grip) as well as the bolt release lever, which is used to slam the bolt closed after inserting a new magazine.  The ejection port is located on the right side of the weapon.

The CPW has a collapsible metal stock that provides stability during aimed fire. When collapsed, the weapon is not much larger than a conventional pistol, allowing for easy handling and concealment; the CPW can be carried in a holster.

Two Picatinny rails are provided in the CPW for mounting sights and tactical accessories – one continuous rail runs across the top of the receiver and a second shorter accessory rail is installed under the barrel, in front of the trigger guard. The top rail can accommodate conventional iron sights or optoelectronic sighting devices such as reflex sights. The bottom rail is intended primarily for laser aiming modules, vertical grips and flashlights.

Users
  - As of 2019, used in limited numbers by special police units.
  - Used by Singapore Prisons Emergency Action Response.

See also
 FN P90
 Heckler & Koch MP7
 AR-57
 Steyr TMP
 Pindad PS-01
 FN Five-seven
 Modern Sub Machine Carbine

Notes

External links
 ST Engineering—Official site

Firearms articles needing expert attention
5.7×28mm firearms
HK 4.6×30mm firearms
9mm Parabellum firearms
Personal defense weapons
Submachine guns
Delayed blowback firearms
Weapons of Singapore
Machine pistols